Jorge Ciro Fucile Perdomo (born 19 November 1984) is a Uruguayan former professional footballer. A defender, he was equally at ease on the right or left flank.

After starting out at Liverpool Montevideo he moved to Porto in Portugal, going on to appear in 155 competitive matches over eight seasons and win 11 major titles, including five Primeira Liga championships and the 2011 Europa League.

An Uruguayan international from 2006 to 2017, Fucile represented the country in two World Cups and three Copa América tournaments.

Club career

Early years and Porto
Born in Montevideo, Fucile began his career with hometown's Liverpool Fútbol Club. On 31 August 2006 he was transferred on loan to FC Porto in Portugal, appearing in 18 games in his first season as the northerners won a second consecutive Primeira Liga; the move was made permanent on 1 July 2007, with the player signing a five-year contract.

Subsequently, Fucile continued to appear regularly for Porto on both sides of the back four. He added a further two leagues to his honours, while contributing a total of 38 matches.

In the 2011–12 season, under new manager Vítor Pereira, Fucile lost his importance in the first team – after Cristian Săpunaru's injury, central defender Maicon was chosen as his successor. In mid-January 2012 he moved on loan to Brazil's Santos FC in a one-year-long deal, being released by his parent club exactly one year later but re-admitted in March 2013.

Later career
In late December 2013, also not being part of new coach Paulo Fonseca's plans, Fucile intended to return to Uruguay after agreeing a deal with Club Nacional de Football for the 2014 Clausura, but the deal fell through; he eventually signed in July. On 17 February 2014, he was condemned to pay a €45,000 fine for assaulting two stewards at the Estádio da Luz, following a tunnel brawl during the 0–1 away league loss against S.L. Benfica on 20 December 2009.

In July 2019, after a further four Uruguayan Primera División seasons with Nacional and a failed trial at Club Plaza Colonia de Deportes, the 34-year-old Fucile joined FC Cartagena of the Spanish Segunda División B, coached by his compatriot Gustavo Munúa. He returned to his country on 29 October 2020 after 11 months of inactivity, signing a short-term contract at Segunda División club Juventud de Las Piedras.

International career

Fucile made his debut for Uruguay on 24 May 2006, in a 2–0 friendly win over Romania in Los Angeles. Already as first choice, he played four games at the 2007 Copa América as the national team finished fourth.

Fucile was then selected for the 2010 FIFA World Cup in South Africa, making five appearances for the semi-finalists, including the knockout stage victories against South Korea and Ghana (the latter after a penalty shootout). He missed the 2011 Copa América which his country won, but made Óscar Tabárez's squad for the following World Cup in Brazil.

At the 2015 Copa América, Fucile was named in the squad despite playing just 142 minutes of football all year due to thigh injury. In his only appearance of the tournament in place of suspended Álvaro Pereira, he was one of two Uruguay players sent off in the 1–0 quarter-final defeat to hosts Chile. He also went to the next year's edition in the United States, but did not leave the bench.

Career statistics

Club

International

Honours

Porto
Primeira Liga: 2006–07, 2007–08, 2008–09, 2010–11, 2011–12
Taça de Portugal: 2008–09, 2009–10
Supertaça Cândido de Oliveira: 2009, 2011, 2013
UEFA Europa League: 2010–11
Taça da Liga runner-up: 2009–10
UEFA Super Cup runner-up: 2011

Santos
Campeonato Paulista: 2012

Nacional
Uruguayan Primera División: 2014–15, 2016

References

External links

National team data 

1984 births
Living people
Uruguayan sportspeople of Italian descent
Uruguayan footballers
Footballers from Montevideo
Association football defenders
Uruguayan Primera División players
Uruguayan Segunda División players
Liverpool F.C. (Montevideo) players
Club Nacional de Football players
Juventud de Las Piedras players
Primeira Liga players
Liga Portugal 2 players
FC Porto players
FC Porto B players
Santos FC players
Segunda División B players
FC Cartagena footballers
Uruguay international footballers
2007 Copa América players
2010 FIFA World Cup players
2014 FIFA World Cup players
2015 Copa América players
Copa América Centenario players
Uruguayan expatriate footballers
Expatriate footballers in Portugal
Expatriate footballers in Brazil
Expatriate footballers in Spain
Uruguayan expatriate sportspeople in Portugal
Uruguayan expatriate sportspeople in Brazil
Uruguayan expatriate sportspeople in Spain